The junior homonym Coenobita Gistl, 1848 is now the moth genus Ectropis.

The genus Coenobita contains 17 species of terrestrial hermit crabs. Several species in this genus are kept as pets.

EcologyCoenobita species carry water in the gastropod shells they inhabit, allowing them to stay out of water for a long time.

Distribution
The majority of the species are found in the Indo-Pacific region, with only one species in West Africa, one species occurring along the Atlantic coast of the Americas, and one species occurring on the Pacific coast of the Americas.

TaxonomyCoenobita is closely related to the coconut crab, Birgus latro, with the two genera making up the family Coenobitidae. The name Coenobita'' was coined by Pierre André Latreille in 1829, from an Ecclesiastical Latin word, ultimately from the Greek , meaning "commune";  the genus is masculine in gender.

References

External links

Hermit crabs
Terrestrial crustaceans
Decapod genera